Leprechaun: Origins is a 2014 American slasher film directed by Zach Lipovsky, written by Harris Wilkinson and starring Dylan Postl (better known by his wrestling ring name Hornswoggle). It is a reboot of Leprechaun and the seventh installment in the Leprechaun franchise. WWE Studios President Michael Luisi has described the film as "a little darker, a little more traditional horror than the Warwick Davis ones that people remember".

The film was released to select theaters on August 22, 2014, followed by VOD on 26 August and a DVD/Blu-ray release on September 30.

Plot
A young couple, Catherine and Francois, are attempting to escape from a figure who eventually catches and drags Francois to his death. It also grabs hold of Catherine just before she arrives at a monolith in a grassland.

Four American college friends, Sophie, Ben, Jeni, and David are vacationing in the Irish countryside at Sophie's behest. The driver, Ian, lets them go at the monolith seen in the beginning. Sophie, who is a history bachelor, takes note of the monolith's symbol before heading to a local bar with the others, where they meet with a friendly old man, Hamish, who tells them about the history of the village: it was formerly a mining center for gold obtained in a nearby cavern, but when the gold ran out, the population dwindled. The four agree to be taken to a cottage where they can begin hitchhiking to the cavern, though they are wary of Hamish and his grumpy son, Sean.

That night, Jeni investigates a ruckus outside and glimpses a figure sprinting past the window. She wakes the others, who discover that Hamish and Sean had locked them up. A figure suddenly enters the cottage through the fireplace and forcibly takes Jeni's gold earring. After a brief struggle which sees David's leg being bitten by the monster, the four escape the cottage and race to the village hall, where they hide in the cellar. From a mythology book, Sophie learns that the monster is a Tuatha Dé Danann, also known as a leprechaun, who owns the gold that the villagers sought after. Hamish and the villagers refused to return the gold and didn't want to leave the village. In return for the gold, the villagers have to sacrifice at least two humans each year as "compensation". The leprechaun lusts after gold, but it can be repelled by a certain symbol, the same one carved into the monolith, which serves as a barrier beyond which the being cannot get out. There was another monolith symbol barrier at the leprechaun's cave; however, when the villagers mined the cave and took the gold, the cave collapsed, causing the leprechaun to escape 15 years ago. Hamish and Sean are joined by their friend Ian outside, where Hamish tells him of his suspicions of his son becoming disillusioned with their sacrifice plot.

The four are confronted by Hamish, who confirms that the villagers sacrifice tourists each year to avoid having to sacrifice themselves, and Sean, who has grown weary of the unjustified sacrifices, eventually lets them go, while Hamish finds Ian impaled on some farm equipment in a shed. He escapes as the creature kills Ian. The four take the offer to escape from an old woman, Mary, who is revealed to be Hamish's accomplice. The four are then tied to trees as offerings for the leprechaun. The monster arrives and rips out Jeni's golden tongue ring. David manages to get the leprechaun away from Jeni, but the beast slashes his torso, also cutting the rope, allowing him to break free and release the other three before he is attacked and killed. The remaining trio head back to the cottage to set a trap to kill the monster, but the leprechaun tricks Sophie and Ben into striking Jeni with their axes, killing her.

Sophie and Ben fetch Hamish's truck but are cornered by the leprechaun inside the village hall. The leprechaun eventually gets hold of Ben and kills him by ripping his spine out. Though cornered by Hamish, who is still intent on sacrificing her, Sophie is saved by Sean, who pushes Hamish into the cellar out of guilt for letting his father and the villagers sacrifice so many people over the years. The leprechaun kills Hamish in the cellar, much to Sean's devastation. Meanwhile, Sophie boards Hamish's truck but crashes midway while trying to avoid the leprechaun. She resumes her escape on foot, and when the leprechaun finds her, she distracts it with gold coins, then kills it using Francois' knife, which he had left in the prologue. Sophie finally manages to cross the monolith to safety just as three leprechauns are revealed running in the tall grass before continuing her escape.

Cast
 Stephanie Bennett as Sophie Roberts
 Andrew Dunbar as Ben
 Melissa Roxburgh as Jeni
 Brendan Fletcher as David
 Dylan "Hornswoggle" Postl as The Leprechaun
 Garry Chalk as Hamish McConville
 Teach Grant as Sean McConville
 Bruce Blain as Ian Joyce
 Mary Black as Mary
 Emilie Ullerup as Catherine
 Adam Boys as Francois
 Gary Peterman as Irish Farmer

Marketing

WWE Studios' official YouTube channel premiered a clip from the film, with an introduction by Dylan Postl, in March 2014, in light of Saint Patrick's Day.

Reception

Critical reception for Leprechaun: Origins has been predominantly negative. On Rotten Tomatoes the film has a rating of 0% based on reviews from 7 critics.

Common complaints include clichéd scripting and poor direction. Cliff Wheatley of IGN panned the film: "Slasher movies of this ilk come with a certain expectation of quality. But even the cheapest, most shoddy productions can manage some thrills, kills, and laughs with memorable characters and a cohesive plot when skilled filmmakers are at the helm. Leprechaun: Origins, unfortunately, offers none of these things". We Got This Covered criticized the movie for being overly clichéd: "Honestly, the scariest bit of Lipovski’s vision is how blatantly stolen most scenes feel, be it the 'long grass' scene from Jurassic Park: The Lost World or detailed costume rips from Red Clover, but what else do you expect from an unintelligible cash-in short on reveals, lacking on death scenes, and heavy on infuriating redundancy?"

References

External links
 
 

2014 fantasy films
2014 directorial debut films
2014 films
2014 horror films
American monster movies
American slasher films
American supernatural horror films
2010s English-language films
Films set in Ireland
Leprechaun (film series)
Lionsgate films
Reboot films
WWE Studios films
2010s American films